Kinesin family member KIF18A is a human protein encoded by the KIF18A gene. It is part of the kinesin family of motor proteins.

Function 
KIF18A is a plus-end directed motor protein, and migrates to the plus ends of the spindle during early mitosis. It first accumulates there during prophase and metaphase, and is depleted during anaphase.

References

Further reading

External links 
 PDBe-KB provides an overview of all the structure information available in the PDB for Human Kinesin-like protein KIF18A

Human genes
Human proteins
Motor proteins